Elections were held in Central Luzon for seats in the House of Representatives of the Philippines on May 10, 2010.

The candidate with the most votes won that district's seat for the 15th Congress of the Philippines.

Summary
*Total invalid votes and turnout not available for 1st district of Bulacan.

Aurora

Juan Edgardo Angara is the incumbent.

Bataan

1st District
Herminia Roman is the incumbent.  At first, a minor issue erupted as to who would be the official candidate of Lakas-Kampi-CMD in the district: Roman or the governor's daughter, Maria Angela "Gila" Garcia.  Based on the certificate of nomination submitted by both parties, it turned out that Governor Garcia, the provincial Lakas-Kampi chairman, nominated his daughter, while the coalition's central committee named Roman. In an en banc decision however, the Comelec later ruled that Roman is the official Lakas-Kampi-CMD candidate, making Garcia the independent one.

The result of the election is under protest in the House of Representatives Electoral Tribunal.

2nd District
Albert Garcia is the incumbent.

Bulacan

Malolos was given its own congressional seat from Bulacan's 1st district by virtue of Republic Act 9591. However, the Supreme Court ruled it unconstitutional, saying it violated Article VI Section 5 (3) of the Constitution and Section 3 of the Ordinance attached to constitution; Malolos was ruled not to have exceeded the 250,000 population for a separate legislative district.

In Bulacan, members of the same families will run against each other. Former governor Josie dela Cruz established the Del Pilar party (named after Gregorio del Pilar) as the local affiliate of the Liberal Party.

1st District
Ma. Victoria Sy-Alvarado is the incumbent. She will face Roberto Pagdanganan.

Malolos was supposed to have its own representation in the House of Representatives, but was ruled unconstitutional by the Supreme Court for the city did not have enough population to be given separate representation. However, the decision was done after ballots were printed for Malolos and the First District. As such, the election for representative of Bulacan's 1st district would be invalid, "because the election will result in failure to elect since, in actuality, there are no candidates for the First Legislative District (with Malolos City) of Bulacan."

The date an election for representative of Bulacan's 1st district including Malolos will be decided later by the commission. The Commission scheduled the special election, along with other special elections in Basilan and Lanao del Sur, which were delayed when teachers, who were the election supervisors, refused to sit as such due to violence, on September 25. However, the Commission postponed the elections for these areas to October 2. However, due to the approval of contracts for Smartmatic-TIM, the supplier of the counting machines a few weeks prior to the special elections, the Commission decided to postpone the special elections to November 13.

On May 10, with the ballots already printed with only Pagdanganan and Sy-Alvarado contesting the seat, voters had the option of "voting" but their votes would not be counted.

|-bgcolor=efefef
|colspan=5| Election deferred, to be held on November 13, 2010.
|}

Special election
The COMELEC ruled that candidates that contested the Bulacan-1st and Malolos will contest the seat. Aniag and Domingo withdrew prior to the election, while independents Cruz and Valencia did not campaign.

2nd District
Pedro Pancho is the incumbent.  He will face 2007 challenger and former three-term Guiguinto, Bulacan mayor Ambrosio "Boy" Cruz Jr.

3rd District
Incumbent Lorna Silverio is in her third consecutive term already and is ineligible for reelection. She will run for mayor of San Rafael and her husband, Ricardo Silverio, Sr. will run for her seat. His opponents are his son, Ricardo Silverio, Jr. and then incumbent governor of Bulacan, Joselito Mendoza.

The result of the election is under protest in the House of Representatives Electoral Tribunal.

4th District
Reylina Nicholas (Lakas-Kampi-CMD) is in her third consecutive term already and is ineligible for reelection.

Malolos
With the issue on Malolos' separate congressional district from Bulacan's 1st district resolved with finality, an election will be scheduled to elect the representative for Bulacan's 1st district, including Malolos."

With the ballots already printed with only the four candidates contesting the now voided seat, voters had the option of "voting" but their votes would not be counted.

|-bgcolor=efefef
|colspan=5| Election invalidated; election to be held as part of Bulacan–1st on November 13.

San Jose del Monte

San Jose del Monte is a component city of Bulacan. Arthur B. Robes is the incumbent.

Nueva Ecija

Politics in Nueva Ecija will center on two political clans: the Josons and the Umalis. The Josons had ruled Nueva Ecija since after World War II, with anti-Japanese guerrilla leader Eduardo Joson serving from 1959 to 1992; Aurelio Umali ended the Josons' supremacy when he defeated four-time governor Tomas Joson III in 2007 via landslide. The Josons are the ones being shortlisted by local party Bagong Lakas ng Nueva Ecija (BALANE) for the provincial governorship, with first district representative Eduardo Nonato N. Joson, Eduardo's nephew vice governor Edward Thomas and Tomas III. Eduardo claimed that Umali's 2007 victory was a fluke. Umali's governance was seen as "worse than the Josons" and several local officials identified with Lakas Kampi CMD said they are willing to cross party lines to support the Eduardo.

Umali first defeated a Joson when we wrestled the third district from now vice governor Edward Thomas in 2004. In 2007, Umali's wife Czarina also won at the third district as their representative. Umali created the local party Unang Sigaw, Partido ng Pagbabago as an answer to the Joson's BALANE.

Joson's BALANE is affiliated with the Nationalist People's Coalition (NPC), while Umali's Unang Sigaw is affiliated with Lakas Kampi CMD.

1st District
Incumbent Eduardo Nonato N. Joson (independent) won't run to concentrate on bringing the  Bagong Lakas ng Nueva Ecija party to power in the province. His sister Josefina is running as NPC's candidate.

2nd District
Joseph Violago is the incumbent.

3rd District
Wife of incumbent governor Aurelio Umali, Czarina Umali, is the incumbent. Her main opponent will be Eduardo Joson IV.

4th District
Rodolfo Antonio is the incumbent.

Pampanga

1st District
Incumbent Carmelo Lazatin (Lakas Kampi CMD) will go up against Angeles City councillor Ares Yabut (NPC) and businessman Luisito Bacani from the same city (independent).

2nd District
The son of President Gloria Macapagal Arroyo, Mikey Arroyo is the incumbent for two consecutive terms already. However, speculation was rife that President Arroyo herself will run in the district. The president is a registered voter of Lubao, the hometown of her father, president Diosdado Macapagal.

As early as late June 2009, several residents in the district had expressed optimism of having the president as their representative in Congress. The two most often cited reasons are her being a "kabalen" or Kapampangan descent, and being a generous benefactor to the district. The president had visited the district 13 times from February 24 to late June. In November, all six mayors in the second district expressed clamor for her to run; University of the Philippines Diliman professor Randy David had said he would run against the president, but later backpedaled if the president will not step down from the presidency when she files her certificate of candidacy by Nov. 30. In late November, the Pampanga Mayors League (PML) announced via Resolution 77, which was signed by 20 town mayors in a special session, urged the President to "heed the clamor from her constituency to run as second district representative in… Pampanga."

Pampanga gubernatorial candidate and provincial board member Lilia Pineda, a known Arroyo ally, disclosed to the Philippine Star in an interview published November 28, 2009, that Arroyo will file her certificate of candidacy on November 30. Representative Arroyo, on the other hand, has apparently given way to his mother's own congressional bid, Pineda said; meanwhile, professor David has backed out of the race. On November 30, 2009, after much speculation, President Arroyo announced on the Philippine Broadcasting Service her congressional bid for the second district of Pampanga. The president filed her certificate of candidacy on December 1, and her son Mikey retired from politics to give way for her mother to run. Only the Liberal Party is fielding a candidate against the president, with the Nacionalista Party and the United Opposition not fielding anyone. Meanwhile, Feliciano Serrano, an electronics engineer graduate of the University of Santo Tomas from Porac, also filed his own certificate of candidacy as an independent. Serrano will "campaign via text messages and the internet. The Liberal Party did find a candidate in Adonis Simpao, a civic society leader from Guagua. Simpao, a graduate of Don Honorio Ventura College of Arts and Trade in Bacolor, had no plans of running, but then governor Eddie Panlilio persuaded him on the eve of the last day of filing of certificates of candidacies. The last candidate is independent Filipinas Rosario Dayrit Sampang of Porac.

Representative Risa Hontiveros-Baraquel of the AKBAYAN party-list, who is running as one of the senatorial candidates of the Liberal Party, revealed that the president poured in 459 million pesos on infrastructure projects solely for the district. The president's political spokesperson Romulo Macalintal called Hontiveros' revelation "speculative" and baseless, pointing out that the president also had implemented infrastructure projects in places other than Pampanga. Hontiveros maintained that the president's spending in Pampanga was improper.

The Commission on Elections (COMELEC)'s Second Division junked for "lack of merit" Baraquel's disqualification case against the president on January 28, 2010; it has also junked an earlier disqualification case on January 20. This clears the president's congressional campaign at Pampanga's second district. Baraquel elevated the case to the Supreme Court.

Lakas Kampi CMD leaders had said that they will field the president as Speaker of the Philippine House of Representatives; the ruling party has more than 100 incumbents running in the House elections, and several running unopposed or by token opposition, Lakas-Kampi predicts an overwhelming number of their candidates will win their respective races, and that the president will have an easy time of being elected as speaker.

Representative Arroyo himself has been courted by several party-list organizations to be their nominee in the party-list election. An Arroyo is a party-list representative: Maria Lourdes Tuason Arroyo-Lesaca of Kasangga.

3rd District
Aurelio Gonzales, Jr. is the incumbent.

The result of the election is under protest in the House of Representatives Electoral Tribunal.

4th District
Anna York Bondoc is the incumbent.  She will face perennial challenger and former Undersecretary Rene Maglanque, who enjoys the support of both the Liberal Party and the Nationalist People's Coalition.

Tarlac

1st District
Incumbent Monica Prieto-Teodoro (Lakas-Kampi-CMD), wife of presidential candidate Gilberto Teodoro decided to quit politics to support her husband's bid for presidency. Representative Teodoro succeeded her husband as representative from the 1st district, and defeated cousin China Cojuangco in 2007. Lakas Kampi CMD did not name a candidate in this district.

2nd District
Incumbent Jose Villa Agustin Yap (Lakas Kampi CMD), who was supposed to run again for re-election, died on March 2, 2010. His daughter, Susan Yap-Sulit, will run for the election. The name of Jose Yap will remain in the ballot and will go to Susan Yap.

3rd District
Jeci Lapus is the incumbent.

Zambales

1st District
Mitos Magsaysay is the incumbent.

2nd District
Antonio M. Diaz is the incumbent, although he switched parties from Lakas-Kampi-CMD to Lapiang Manggagawa.

References

External links
Official website of the Commission on Elections

2010 Philippine general election
2010